Samoa is a country in the South Pacific.

Samoa may also refer to:
 Samoan Islands, an archipelago comprising all of Samoa and most of American Samoa
 American Samoa, US Pacific Territory
 Samoans
 Samoan language
 Samoa, California
 Samoa, Missouri
 Samoa (ship) - a Liberty ship built in 1943, see :de:Samoa (Schiff, 1943)
 Samoas, a variety of Girl Scout cookie
 Samoa (orca)
 Samoa (harvestman), a genus of harvestmen
Andra Samoa, American Samoan environmentalist

See also

 Sam Moa